Mian Ghulam Shah Kalhoro (died 1772) ) was the ruler of the Kalhora Dynasty from 1758 when he was appointed ruler of Sindh by tribal Chiefs of Kalhora replacing his brother Mian Muradyab Kalhoro. He was recognized and bestowed upon title of Shah Wardi Khan by Afghan King Ahmad Shah Durrani. He was able to bring stability in Sindh after the rule of Main Noor Mohammad Kalhoro; he reorganized the country and defeated the Marathas and their permanent vassal the Rao of Kutch near the Thar Desert and returned victoriously. Ghulam Shah also ordered construction of the Shrine of Shah Abdul Latif Bhittai. The tomb of Ghulam Shah Kalhoro is situated in Hyderabad Sindh, Pakistan.

Invasion of Cutch 
In 1763-64 during the rule of Rao Godji II (1761–1778), Ghulam Shah invaded Kutch with an army of 7000 men, defeated the Rao in a battle near Jara, Kutch in which hundreds of Kutchi people died. Ghulam Shah extract tributes from many chiefs. Punja, the minister of Kutch promised Ghulam Shah a yearly tribute and the hand of Rao's sister who was famous for her beauty. But the Rao failed to meet the demands of Ghulam Shah. So, in 1765 Ghulam Shah again lead another army of 5000 men and captured many territories of Kutch and also took many prisoners including a large number of Hindu girls. After Bhuj, the capital of Kutch was besieged, negotiations started between the two rulers. Godji II agreed to marry a daughter of his cousin Wesuji and also agreed to pay a large indemnity and yearly tribute. Later Ghulam Shah married the daughter of Wesuji, Rao's cousin and the marriage was celebrated with great pomp and splendour on both the sides. In consideration of this relationship, the towns of Busta Bandar, Lakhpat and other territories that had been conquered by the Mián Ghulam Shah Kalhoro, were returned to the Rao of Cutch. In 1768, in order to commemorate his great victories achieved against the Rao of Kutch, Ghulam Shah built a new capital which he named Hyderabad (in honour of Imam Ali whose birth name was Haider meaning Lion). Ghulam Shah died in 1772 and was succeeded by  his son Mian Sarfaraz Khan. Ghulam Shah was a patron of art and culture and built the tomb of his predecessor.

See also
Third battle of Panipat
Shrine of Shah Abdul Latif Bhittai

References

Mughal Empire
History of Sindh
Sindhi people